Werner was a Spanish professional cycling team that existed from 1969 to 1972. It participated in the 1971 Tour de France.

References

Cycling teams based in Spain
Defunct cycling teams based in Spain
1969 establishments in Spain
1972 disestablishments in Spain
Cycling teams established in 1969
Cycling teams disestablished in 1972